Alejandra Quintero Velasco (born September 26, 1976) is a Mexican woman from the state of Nuevo León, who represented her country and placed in the semi-finals in the 1995 Miss World pageant, held in Sun City, South Africa on November 18, 1995.

References 

Living people
Nuestra Belleza México winners
Miss World 1995 delegates
Beauty pageant contestants from Nuevo León
1976 births